The women's K-1 slalom canoeing competition at the 2014 Asian Games in Hanam was held from 1 to 2 October at the Misari Canoe/Kayak Center. The slalom event was on flat water and not an artificial canoe slalom course. Each NOC could enter two athletes but only one of them could advance to the semifinal.

Schedule
All times are Korea Standard Time (UTC+09:00)

Results 
Legend
DSQ — Disqualified

Heats

Repechage

Quarterfinals

Race 1

Race 2

Race 3

Race 4

Summary

Semifinals

Race 1

Race 2

Finals

Bronze medal

Gold medal

References 

Official website

External links 
Asian Canoe Confederation

Canoeing at the 2014 Asian Games
Asian